St Melangell's Church, Pennant Melangell is a small church located on a minor road which joins the B4391 near the village of Llangynog, Powys, Wales. It houses the restored shrine of Saint Melangell, reputed to be the oldest Romanesque shrine in Great Britain.

History
The church of St Melangell is set in a circular churchyard, possibly once a Bronze Age burial site, ringed by ancient yew trees, which may also predate the Christian era. It sits at the foot of a breast-shaped hill, at the edge of the road on the edge of the Berwyn mountains. Also located at the site is the restored shrine of St Melangell, which is reputedly the oldest Romanesque shrine in Britain, dating from the early 12th century.

The shrine is known for the story of St Melangell, who is said in the Historia Divae Monacellae to have hidden a hare in the folds of her cloak to save it from the hounds of Prince Brochwel of Powys: "the pursuing hounds, presumably aware that Melangell's body radiates sanctity, cower and refuse to go near the animal," Jane Cartwright notes, adding, "the power of her virginity protects the creature, since feminine sanctity and virginity are inextricably linked". Though he encouraged his dogs, they could not be urged forward while the virgin remained at prayer, and when his huntsmen went to blow his horn, it stuck to his lips. So impressed was Brochwel by the beauty and courage of this virginal young girl, who had fled from Ireland to avoid a forced marriage, that he gave her the land in the valley where her church still stands. The hares were locally called "Melangell's lambs". Thus like Oudoceus, and Cybi's goat, Melangell "won territory and rights of sanctuary through such animals." "Until the seventeenth century no one would kill a hare in the parish," Agnes Stonehewer remarked in 1876, "and much later, when one was pursued by dogs, it was firmly believed that if anyone cried 'God and St. Monacella be with thee!' it was sure to escape." The hare is also noted as the animal with local sanctity, that must not be killed in Pennant Melangell, by N. W. Thomas in 1900.

Building
The church consists of a nave and chancel in one, an eastern apse, and at the west end a tower. The building is oriented slightly north of true east.  Roofs consist of slates with stone ridge tiles and the base of a cross finial at the east end. Black ceramic ridge tiles adorn the porch. The church contains a fine 15th-century oak rood screen with carvings that tell the story of Melangell and Prince Brochwel:

 "First compartment. Brochwel Yscythrog, Prince of Powys, on horseback; his bridle tied on the mane of the horse; both arms extended; in his right hand a sword which he is brandishing. He wears long hair under a flat cap; a close-fitting coat and girdle, both painted red, and sits in the high saddle of the Middle Ages. He is the most distant figure of the series.
 The second compartment is partly damaged in the branch-work, but the figure is entire. The huntsman, half-kneeling, tries in vain to remove the horn, which he was raising to his lips for the purpose of blowing it. when it remained fast and could not be sounded.
 In the third, St. Melangell, or Monacella, is represented as an abbess; her right hand slightly raised; her left hand grasping a foliated crozier; a veil upon her head. The figure, seated on a red cushion, is larger than that of Brochwel, and smaller than that of the huntsman.
 A hunted hare, crouching or scuttling towards the figure of the Saint. The hare is painted red.
 A greyhound in pursuit; the legs, entangled among the branches of the running border, can hardly be distinguished from them. The dog is painted of a pale colour.
 A nondescript animal, intended, I suppose, for a dog. In this and the 5th compartment the hounds are supposed to be further from the eye than the hare, which is the largest figure in the whole range.
 One tracery panel lies its gouge-work painted red; the gouge-work of the next is blue; that of the next is red; and so on alternately."

The screen itself, on the rood-loft of which the above formed a cornice or frieze, still remains in its position between the chancel and the nave. It comprises four compartments on each side of the doorway, or entrance, which is just double the width of the side divisions; the spandrels are filled with tracery of the same design, and of fourteenth-century character.

There are also two medieval effigies, one of which is thought to represent the saint; a Norman font, a Georgian pulpit, chandelier and commandment board, a series of stone carvings of the hare by the sculptor Meical Watts, and the mysterious Giant's Rib.

Churchyard

The circular churchyard, possibly once a Bronze Age burial site, is ringed by ancient yew trees, which may also predate the Christian era. It contains the war graves of three British Army soldiers of World War I.

Church services
St Melangell's Church has always been a Pilgrims' Church, attracting visitors come from all over Britain and beyond. Sunday services are held throughout the year at 3.00 p.m., an informal liturgy. On Thursday the Holy Eucharist is at noon throughout the year. There is a tradition of serving tea and cake following the Sunday afternoon service.

Footnotes

References
 Pennant Melangell
 Clwyd-Powys Archaeological Trust

Further reading

 Nancy Edwards, "Celtic Saints and Early Medieval Archaeology," in Local saints and local churches in the early medieval West (Oxford University Press, 2002), pp. 234ff. online.

Pennant Melangell
Churches in Powys
Pennant Melangell